Challenger II may refer to:
Challenger 2, British main battle tank
Quad City Challenger II, ultralight aircraft
Challenger II, a microcomputer manufactured by Ohio Scientific in 1977
Challenger II, the American registration name for racehorse and leading sire Challenger (horse)